Tyrannion may refer to:
 Tyrannion of Amisus (fl. 1st century), Greek grammarian
 Tyrannion of Antioch (died c. 308), Patriarch of Antioch
 Tyrannion of Tyre (died 311), Bishop of Tyre
 Tyrannion the Younger, a Greek sophist and pupil of Tyrannion of Amisus
 Tyrannion of Messenia, a Greek philosopher